Kertosono–Mojokerto toll road is a toll road on the island of Java, Indonesia. It is located in East Java province. It is part of Trans-Java toll road and runs from Kertosono to Mojokerto.

The first  phase of this toll road connecting Jombang with Bandar Kedungmulyo opened in October 2014,  while Section 3 of 5 kilometers connecting Mojokerto Barat with Mojokerto has been in operation since December 2016. The  Section 2 links Kedunglosari-Tembelang-Jombang Village with the Pageruyung-Gedeg Village-Mojokerto District and section 4 which is a connection with Solo-Kertosono Toll Road, stretching between Gondangmanis to Brodot in Bandar Kedungmulyo, Jombang was inaugurated by Indonesian President Joko Widodo on 10 September 2017.

Sections
The toll road has following sections,
Section 1: , connecting Jombang with Bandar Kedungmulyo.
Section 2: , between Kedunglosari-Tembelang-Jombang Village to Pageruyung-Gedeg Village-Mojokerto District,
Section 3: , connecting Mojokerto Regency with Mojokerto city,
Section 4: Gondangmanis to Brodot, connecting Solo-Kertosono Toll Road.

Exits

Incidents
On 4 November 2021, there was a traffic collision in Jombang Regency that Vanessa Angel along with her husband, Febri "Bibi" Andriansyah died here.

References

Toll roads in Java
Transport in East Java